Lavrentis Dianellos (Greek: Λαυρέντης Διανέλλος; 1911 – 16 September 1978) was a Greek actor. From 1948 to 1975, he appeared in 200 films, leading one reviewer to call him "ubiquitous."

Indicative filmography
 Agonia (1969)
 Voitheia! O Vegos faneros praktor 000 (1967) ..... Mr. Psaltis
 Law 4000 (1962) ..... Lefteris
 The Downhill (1961) ..... Sotiris Siakas
 Madalena (1960) ..... Kapetan Kosmas
 Eglima sta paraskinia (1960)
 The Policeman of the 16th Precinct (1959) ..... Mastrolavrentis
 We Have Only One Life (1958) ..... Anastassis
 A Hero in His Slippers (1958) ..... Apostolos Dekavallas
 The Counterfeit Coin (1958) ..... Uncle Fotis
 The Germans Strike Again (1948) ..... Lefteris

External links
News of Lavrentis Dianellos In Greek
NY Times

1911 births
1978 deaths
Greek male film actors
20th-century Greek male actors
People from Magnesia (regional unit)